Arne Bryngelsson (17 February 1915 – 18 February 1981) was a Swedish footballer who played as a forward. He made two appearances for Sweden, 180 Allsvenskan appearances for Sandvikens IF and 25 Allsvenskan appearances for Djurgårdens IF.

References

1915 births
1981 deaths
Association football forwards
Swedish footballers
Sweden international footballers
Allsvenskan players
Djurgårdens IF Fotboll players